The 2018 Rally Mexico (formally known as the Rally Guanajuato Mexico 2018) was a motor racing event for rally cars that was held over four days between 8 and 11 March 2018. It marked the fifteenth running of Rally Mexico, and was the third round of the 2018 World Rally Championship and its support categories, the WRC-2 and WRC-3 championships.

Kris Meeke and Paul Nagle were the defending rally winners. Sébastien Ogier and Julien Ingrassia were the rally winners. Their team, M-Sport Ford WRT, were the manufacturers' winners. The Škoda Motorsport crew of Pontus Tidemand and Jonas Andersson won the World Rally Championship-2 category in a Škoda Fabia R5. In the World Rally Championship-3, there were no classified finishers.

Background

Championship standings prior to the event
Thierry Neuville and Nicolas Gilsoul entered the round with a ten-point lead in the World Championship for Drivers and Co-drivers. In the World Championship for Manufacturers, Hyundai Shell Mobis WRT held a one-point lead over Toyota Gazoo Racing WRT.

Entry list
The following crews were entered into the rally. The event was open to crews competing in the World Rally Championship, World Rally Championship-2, and the World Rally Championship-3. The final entry list consisted of eleven World Rally Cars, seven World Rally Championship-2 entries, and one World Rally Championship-3 entry.

Route
After starting in Mexico City in 2017, 2018 Rally Mexico returned to its traditional start in Guanajuato. The route featured minor changes and included a new Power Stage.

Report

Pre-event

The event marks the return of nine-time world champion Sébastien Loeb and is his first rally since the 2015 Monte Carlo Rally.

Thursday
Thursday saw Thierry Neuville topped his Hyundai i20 after Kris Meeke took the shakedown. Ott Tänak was second on the timesheets, 1.9 seconds slower than the championship leader's storming run. Defending world champion Sébastien Ogier was third, 2 seconds off the lead. Toyota teammates, Jari-Matti Latvala and Esapekka Lappi, and Norwegian Andreas Mikkelsen completed the top six. Last year winner Meeke was seventh overall, followed by Dani Sordo and Elfyn Evans. Nine-time world champion Sébastien Loeb finished his first special stage after 2015 with tenth position.

Friday
Dani Sordo, who targeted himself for a podium finish, led nine-time world champion Sébastien Loeb by 7.2 seconds after two days. Both drivers benefited from low start positions in the sweltering mountain speed tests above León. Ott Tänak, 11 seconds off the pace in third, drove around overheating problems in his Toyota Yaris, ahead of last year winner Kris Meeke. Defending world champion Sébastien Ogier limited his losses from second in the start order in fifth place, despite a spin. Norwegian Andreas Mikkelsen was sixth, only 1.5 seconds behind the Frenchman. It was a nightmare catastrophe for championship leader Thierry Neuville. The road opener fared worst in the conditions and lost more than 20 seconds due to a fuel pressure problem and a power steering issue in his i20. He placed seventh overall when Jari-Matti Latvala retired with alternator problems before SS9. Elfyn Evans retired from the rally because of rolling out though he managed to reach the finish line, while teammate Teemu Suninen and Esapekka Lappi retired from the day due to hitting a barrier and crashing respectively. WRC 2 leader Pontus Tidemand, Gus Greensmith and Pedro Heller completed the top ten.

Saturday
Nine-time world champion Sébastien Loeb took an early lead from Dani Sordo, who finished third after the day, until he suffered a front left puncture. The 44-year-old Frenchman conceded almost two and a half minutes when he stopped to change the wheel after hitting a stone in his Citroën C3 and plunged to fifth, while defending world champion Sébastien Ogier took over the lead position with four consecutive stage wins in the afternoon. Teammate Kris Meeke was over half a minute off the pace, second place overall. Ott Tänak's overnight third vanished in the opening stage. The Estonian limped through the second half with a turbo boost problem in his Toyota Yaris and retired soon after, which made Andreas Mikkelsen and championship leader Thierry Neuville climb up to fourth and sixth respectively. WRC 2 leader Pontus Tidemand was seventh, ahead of category second Gus Greensmith. Jari-Matti Latvala returned to the rally after the previous day's alternator-induced retirement. The Toyota leader finished ninth, while Chile's Pedro Heller completed the leaderboard.

Sunday

Sébastien Ogier sealed his forty-second career victory, despite receiving a 10-second penalty for cutting a chicane. By virtue this win, he recaptured the position of championship leader from Thierry Neuville, who had a terrible weekend and finished sixth overall. Kris Meeke lost second place to Friday leader Dani Sordo after a half roll this morning. Andreas Mikkelsen finished fourth, a further 19.2 seconds behind, after struggling with his i20's handling throughout. Nine-time champion Sébastien Loeb was fifth and took an extra point at the Power Stage. WRC 2 winner Pontus Tidemand finished seventh ahead of Jari-Matti Latvala, who fought back onto the leaderboard after retiring his Toyota Yaris on Friday with alternator problems. WRC 2 drivers Gus Greensmith and Pedro Heller completed the top ten. Ott Tänak finished fourteenth overall, but he took full five points from the Power Stage.

Classification

Top ten finishers
The following crews finished the rally in each class's top ten.

Other notable finishers
The following notable crews finished the rally outside top ten.

Special stages

Power stage
The Power stage was an 11.07 km stage at the end of the rally. Additional World Championship points were awarded to the five fastest crews.

Penalties
The following notable crews were given time penalty during the rally.

Retirements
The following notable crews retired from the event. Under Rally2 regulations, they were eligible to re-enter the event starting from the next leg. Crews that re-entered were given an additional time penalty.

Championship standings after the rally

Drivers' championships

Co-Drivers' championships

Manufacturers' and teams' championships

Notes

References

External links

  
 2018 Rally Mexico in e-wrc website
 The official website of the World Rally Championship

2018 in Mexican motorsport
Mexico
March 2018 sports events in Mexico
2018 Rally Mexico